Achilles Guard, Inc., commonly known as Critical Watch, is a security, risk and compliance company based in Dallas, Texas. The company primarily manufactures computer vulnerability assessment software and Payment Card Industry (PCI) compliance software. The company is CVE-compatible and was co-founded in 2000 by Eva Bunker and Nelson Bunker.

On January 6, 2015, Alert Logic announced that it had acquired Critical Watch for its scanning and analysis capabilities

References

External links
 CriticalWatch official website
 Critical Watch Blog

Companies based in Dallas
Software companies based in Texas
Defunct software companies of the United States